Manju Kumari Chaudhary is a Nepali communist politician. She was elected to the second Constituent Assembly from CPN UML under the first-past-the-post system, from Udayapur-2 constituency, in the 2013 election, defeating her nearest rival, Pramila Rai of Nepali Congress, by a margin of 23 votes. She was 39 years old at the time.

References

Living people
Year of birth missing (living people)
Place of birth missing (living people)
21st-century Nepalese women
People from Udayapur District
Nepal Communist Party (NCP) politicians
Communist Party of Nepal (Unified Marxist–Leninist) politicians